The Dehiwala train bombing was a terrorist attack carried out by the Liberation Tigers of Tamil Eelam (LTTE) during the rush hour of July 24, 1996.

Incident 
The Dehiwala train bombing resulted in 64 civilian deaths and wounding 400 others. The attack was carried out by LTTE operatives placing suitcase bombs in four carriages on a commuter train. The simultaneous explosion of these bombs resulted in a large number of casualties. The technique of simultaneously exploding multiple bombs in several carriages was used for the first time in this attack.

Reaction

In a July 25, 1996, statement the U.S. State Department and EU condemned the bombing of the Dehiwela railway station in Colombo and called on the LTTE to renounce the use of terrorism, also in July, the Indian government extended its ban on LTTE as an unlawful association under section 3 of the Unlawful Activities (Prevention) Act, 1967.

See also
List of terrorist incidents, 1996

References

Further reading

External links
 
 
 
 

Attacks on civilians attributed to the Liberation Tigers of Tamil Eelam
Massacres in Sri Lanka
July 1996 crimes
Liberation Tigers of Tamil Eelam attacks against trains
Liberation Tigers of Tamil Eelam attacks in Eelam War III
Mass murder in 1996
Mass murder of Sinhalese
Terrorist incidents in Sri Lanka in 1996